Hoi Sham is one of the 24 constituencies in the Kowloon City District of Hong Kong which was created in 1994.

The constituency loosely covers coastal area of To Kwa Wan with the estimated population of 15,116.

Councillors represented

Election results

2010s

2000s

1990s

References

Constituencies of Hong Kong
Constituencies of Kowloon City District Council
1991 establishments in Hong Kong
Constituencies established in 1991
To Kwa Wan